Abdul Jalil Ibrahim Habib Al Tarif (born ) is a Bahraini academic, journalist, and politician.

Biography
Born in the village of Sanabis on June 20, 1949, Al Tarif earned a Bachelor of Arts in Arabic Language and Islamic Studies from the Faculty of Jurisprudence at the University of Kufa in Najaf, Iraq. He taught for the Ministry of Education from 1970 to 1974, then worked at the Secretariat of the National Assembly in 1975. After the Assembly's dissolution that year, he began working for the Ministry of State for Cabinet Affairs and as a broadcaster for the Bahrain Radio and Television Corporation from 1975 on. From 2002 to 2006, he served as an appointed member of the upper house of Parliament, the Consultative Council.

References

Members of the Consultative Council (Bahrain)
Bahraini academics
1949 births
Living people